Delureni may refer to several villages in Romania:

 Delureni, a village in Urmeniș Commune, Bistriţa-Năsăud County
 Delureni, a village in Ponoarele Commune, Mehedinţi County
 Delureni, a village in Ionești, Vâlcea
 Delureni, a village in Stoilești Commune, Vâlcea County
 Delureni, a village in Valea Mare, Vâlcea
 Delureni, the name of Beznea village, Bratca Commune, Bihor County, between 1964 and 1996

See also 
 Dealu (disambiguation)
 Deleni (disambiguation)
 Deleanu (surname)